Hovden or Barekstadlandet is an island in the municipality of Kinn in Vestland county, Norway. Most of the 68 inhabitants (in 2001) live along the eastern coast of the island. Kvanhovden Lighthouse is located on the northwestern shore of the island. The island is very rocky, mountainous, and barren.

See also
List of islands of Norway

References

Islands of Vestland
Kinn